Volunteer Gliding Squadrons (VGSs) are Royal Air Force (UK) Flying Training units, operating military Viking T1 conventional gliders to train cadets from the Royal Air Force Air Cadets.

Since 2014, the squadrons operate under No. 2 Flying Training School, which was newly reformed for this purpose at RAF Syerston, Nottinghamshire, within No.22 (Training) Group of the Royal Air Force. The 10 Units, along with the Royal Air Force Central Gliding School, are standardised annually by the Royal Air Force Central Flying School. Formerly under the Air Cadet Organisation prior to 2010, Headquarters Air Cadets presently still retains administrative support.

VGSs are made up of volunteer staff. Each is headed by a Commanding Officer and several executives, who are appointed by a Cadet Forces Commission in the RAF Air Cadets. Instructors are a mixture of regular RAF/RN/Army personnel, reservists, RAFAC personnel, Civilian Gliding Instructors (CGIs) and Flight Staff Cadets (FSCs).

History
Gliding was first introduced for the Air Defence Cadet Corps in 1939, but formally became part of official training with the Air Training Corps in 1942. From 1946, 87 Gliding Schools (GSs) came under the Reserve Command.

Command
Initially the gliding schools were established under RAF Reserve Command (later to become RAF Home Command). In 1955, RAF Flying Training Command took over the responsibility and amalgamated them into 27 gliding schools under Headquarters Air Cadets. At the same time the gliding schools were renumbered with three-digit numbers, the first two digits being the parent Home Command Group (Nos. 61, 62, 63, 64, 66 or 67). In 1968, RAF Training Command was established, incorporating Flying Training Command. In 1977, Training Command was absorbed into RAF Support Command, and then moved into Personnel and Training Command on its establishment in 1994 before being subsumed into Air Command in March 2007, where the gliding schools rest today.

Under Air Command, the chain of command for these units is through No.22 (Training) Group. On behalf of Air Officer Commanding No.22 (Training) Group, the Volunteer Gliding Squadrons and the Central Gliding School are the responsibility of the Officer commanding No. 2 Flying Training School.

Formation of the Central Gliding School (CGS)
Formulated in 1946, the Home Command Gliding Instructors School (HCGIS) was established in 1949 at RAF Detling to train Qualified Gliding Instructors for the gliding schools. With the disestablishment of Home Command, HCGIS was split into two Gliding Centres to accommodate the gliding schools in the north and south of the UK. A further reorganisation amalgamated the Gliding Centres into the Central Gliding School in 1972 at RAF Spitalgate, where it was renamed the Air Cadet Central Gliding School (ACCGS) in 1974. In 2009, following the formal approval of the CGS unit badge, the Air Cadet Central Gliding School was renamed the Royal Air Force Central Gliding School and in 2010 restructured under No.1 Elementary Flying Training School.

The CGS is commanded by a Wing Commander RAF, who also acts as OC Flying for RAF Syerston. The Chief Instructor is a Squadron Leader RAF. The examiners of the CGS are Flight Lieutenant RAFR and Squadron Leader RAFR officers, however all future appointments shall be RAFVR(T) commissions.

From wood to GRP
The RAF chose to re-equip the ageing fleet with the first of the modern GRP gliders, and in 1983 acquired an initial batch of 10 Schleicher ASK 21 named Vanguard TX.1.  The first examples were delivered to the ACCGS at Syerston in time for the new Instructors' courses to take place.  The first VGS to equip with these was 618 VGS at RAF West Malling. Instructors from this unit were converted to the new training syllabus and began flying the type during July and August of that year.  The first Vanguard TX.1s were delivered to West Malling in July 1983 and training for cadets began in August.

After the initial 10 were delivered, Alexander Schleicher was unwilling to open a production line for the MoD, as they did not want to sideline their civilian market.  A tender was issued and Grob Aerospace was awarded the contract to supply 100 Grob G 103 Twin II Acro Gliders.  The RAF named the military variant as the Viking T1 in Air Cadet service.  A single specimen was delivered to Slingsby Aviation in the UK for fatigue life testing.

Introduction of motor gliders
The Venture T.1 was trialled at the ACCGS at RAF Spitalgate in 1971/73. 10 GSs were first issued with the T.1 variant in 1977, but were quickly upgraded with the TX.2. The development of many sites and closures of many RAF aerodromes put strain on many conventional VGS. Further GSs were allocated with the TX.2s. In 1991 the Venture TX.2 was replaced with the Vigilant T.1. Originally designated the Vigilant TX.1, the glider designation 'X' was dropped due to its change of role.

Disbandment of the competition fleet
In 2000, ACO-COS Group Captain Mike Cross announced the sale of the Valiant TX.1 and Kestrel TX.1 fleets. This concluded the RAF's many successful years competing in national gliding competitions and setting world records.

Schools to squadrons
Initially established as Gliding Schools, the GSs were re-designated Volunteer Gliding Schools (VGSs) in 1978. In 2005, following a decision by the Royal Air Force Board, the VGSs were renamed Volunteer Gliding Squadrons, keeping their VGS abbreviation.

Air Cadets to Royal Air Force
Following the restructure in 2005, a further reorganisation was initiated in 2010 by AOC 22 Group RAF. On 1 April 2010, Command and Control together with the responsibility for supervision and regulation of the Central Gliding School and 27 Volunteer Gliding Squadrons, was moved from the Air Cadet Organisation to the Directorate of Flying Training under No. 1 Elementary Flying School (No.1 EFTS). A further restructure in December 2011 saw No.1 EFTS absorbed into No.3 Flying Training School, together with a Gliding branch of the School developed from No.1 EFTS.

Extended pause and reinvention 

With the introduction of the Grob Prefect T.1 into Elementary Flying Training, the RAF's Grob Tutor T.1 fleet faced a reduction against the Vigilant T.1 due to competing roles for cadet powered flying. 22 Group decided the Vigilant T.1 had to be withdrawn to protect the Air Experience Flights (AEFs) operated by retired senior officers, despite the Vigilant T.1's more capable role with sending cadets solo. In April 2014, all Air Cadet Organisation gliding was abruptly halted under the auspices of "airworthiness concerns". Maintenance records managed by Serco were found to be in disarray. Flying resumed to a limited extent in 2016.

In March 2016, a major restructuring of Air Cadet Gliding and Flying was announced, resulting in the disbanding of 14 VGSs, significant reduction of the Vigilant, a regional focus of remaining Viking squadrons, and an increase in Tutor AEF flying. With the Vigilant due to be withdrawn from service in 2019, its retirement was brought forward to May 2018. Two new Air AEF squadrons will be formed.

A review of the Defence Estate, published in November 2016, confirmed the disbandments announced in March and gave estimated dates for disposal of several sites.

Despite the Vigilant T.1 fleet being declared unairworthy and uneconomical to return to the air, all 63 grounded Vigilant T.1 were sold to Hampshire-based charity Aerobility, which works with people with disabilities and injured ex-military personnel. A number would be modified and refurbished for use by the charity, while the majority would be sold to support the charity.

Current units

Conventional glider VGSs (Viking)
 611 VGS (RAF Honington)
 614 VGS (MDP Wethersfield)
 615 VGS (RAF Kenley)
621 VGS (RAF Little Rissington)
 622 VGS (Trenchard Lines)
 626 VGS (Predannack)
 631 VGS (RAF Woodvale), formerly 186 GS
 632 VGS (RAF Ternhill)
 637 VGS (RAF Little Rissington)
 644 VGS (RAF Syerston)
 645 VGS (RAF Topcliffe)
 661 VGS (RAF Kirknewton)

Central Flying School
 HQ, No. 2 Flying Training School RAF (RAF Syerston)
 Central Gliding School (RAF Syerston)

Disbanded units

Conventional glider VGSs
 617 VGS (formerly at RAF Manston before that at RAF Bovingdon and originally at  RAF Hendon)
 623 VGS (RAF Tangmere)
 625 VGS (Hullavington), formerly 83 GS – amalgamated with 621 VGS, 1 August 2013
 643 VGS (RAF Syerston), formerly 107 EGS – amalgamated with 644 VGS, 1 August 2013
 662 VGS (RM Condor), formerly 2 GS and 5 GS – closure announced on 10 March 2016

Motor glider VGSs
 611 VGS (RAF Honington), formerly 102 GS and formerly at RAF Swanton Morley, and after that at STANTA Airfield (RAF Watton)
 612 VGS (Dalton Barracks), formerly 104 GS – disbanded 14 August 2016
 613 VGS (RAF Halton), formerly C122 GS – closure announced on 10 March 2016
 616 VGS (RAF Henlow), formerly 106 GS – closure announced on 10 March 2016
 618 VGS (RAF Odiham), (formerly at RAF West Malling), formerly 146 GS and 168 GS – closure announced on 10 March 2016
 624 VGS (RMB Chivenor), formerly 84 GS – closure announced on 10 March 2016
 633 VGS (RAF Cosford) – closure announced on 10 March 2016
 634 VGS (MOD St. Athan), formerly 68 GS – closure announced on 10 March 2016
 635 VGS (RAF Topcliffe) (formerly at BAE Samlesbury) – closure announced on 10 March 2016
 636 VGS (Swansea Airport) – closure announced on 10 March 2016
 642 VGS (RAF Linton-on-Ouse), formerly 23 GS – closure announced on 10 March 2016
 663 VGS (RAF Kinloss) – closure announced on 10 March 2016
 664 VGS (Newtownards) – closure announced on 10 March 2016

Structure

Personnel
Staff of a Volunteer Gliding Squadron are part-time personnel (usually specifically appointed Reserve Officers and civilians), supernumerary personnel (who are either regular or reservist members of the Armed Forces or Cadet Force Volunteers), and Flight Staff Cadets.

Appointed personnel
Reserve Officers are appointed to fulfil management positions mandated to operate a Squadron. Civilians start under probation as Under Training Instructors; their probation ends on attaining B2 Category Qualified Gliding Instructor (QGI) status. Personnel must attain a B1 Category QGI rating before qualifying for a Reserve Commission for an intended appointment. Executive Officers (XOs) head the leadership of the Squadron as OC, CFI and DCFI.

Commissioned posts on VGS include:

 Officer Commanding (OC) in the rank of Squadron Leader
 Chief Flying Instructor (CFI) in the rank of Flight Lieutenant
 Technical Officer (TechO) in the rank of Flight Lieutenant
 Adjutant in the rank of Flight Lieutenant 
 Equipment Officer

Other appointed roles include:
 Unit Navigation Officer (UNavO)
 Mechanical Transport Officer (MTO)
 Flight Safety Officer (FSO)
 Training Officer (TrgO)

Supernumerary personnel
Supernumerary personnel are part-time staff whose primary appointment is elsewhere, thus their VGS appointment is their secondary duty. They are from various Commissioned and Non-Commissioned branches of the Regular, Reserve and Cadet Forces.

Flight Staff Cadets
Air Cadets from either the Combined Cadet Force or RAF Air Cadets can be appointed as Flight Staff Cadets (FSCs) on a VGS. FSCs are selected, usually after completing Advanced Glider Training, from those who show potential to become Gliding Instructors. FSC’s do not act as a substitute for VGS adult personnel, primarily providing ground support to the Squadrons. However, they are able to progress to a B2 Category status (less the supervisory privileges).

Flying training
Flying Training is carried out to the syllabus of the RAF Central Flying School. Ab-initio training starts with three initial courses, followed with Basic Pilot Training to achieve flying Grades.

 Gliding Induction Courses (GICs) – 20–30 minute sorties designed to give a basic appreciation of aircraft handling.
 Gliding Scholarship (GS) – an eight-hour course to flying solo. An additional two hours can be awarded to achieve the course aim. Trainees attain the aircrew training standard GS. Two sets of Wings can be awarded to Air Cadets: blue for completing the GS syllabus to the required ATS, and silver for flying a solo circuit.
 Advanced Gliding Training (AGT) – a five-hour course to provide a greater appreciation of advanced handling, and five additional solo circuits. Trainees attain the aircrew training standard AGT. Air Cadets completing this course are awarded gold Wings.

Flying qualifications
The following Pilot qualifications can be obtained on VGSs:
 Pilot Grade 2 (G2) – qualified solo on aircraft type.
 Pilot Grade 1 (G1) – qualified on aircraft type, allowing flying with passengers. G1s are additionally authorised to teach GIC exercises, to provide handling experience required for an Instructor category.

Instructor qualifications can be attained following the completion of a course at the Royal Air Force Central Gliding School:
 B2 Category Instructor – a Qualified Gliding Instructor that requires close supervision.
 B1 Category Instructor – a competent Qualified Gliding Instructor.

Higher instructor qualifications can be attained following the completion of an examination by the Royal Air Force Central Flying School Gliding Examiners:

 A2 Category Instructor – an above average Qualified Gliding Instructor. This qualification is denoted by the symbol cfs(g) in the Air Force List for commissioned instructors.
 A1 Category Instructor  – an exceptional Qualified Gliding Instructor. This qualification is denoted by the symbol cfs*(g) in the Air Force List for commissioned instructors.

Additional ratings:
 Flying Supervisor (FS) for the roles of OC, CFI and DCFI. This is notated by a * after the category, e.g. "A2*".
 Navigation Instructor Qualification (NIQ) for teaching instructors to award TQs and BNQs.
 Transit Qualification (TQ) for ferry flying.
 Basic Navigation Qualification (BNQ) for teaching navigation.

Aircraft

Conventional gliders

In service
 Grob Aerospace Viking TX.1 (100 entered service, later reduced to around 77)

No longer in service

Non-GRP construction

Single-seat
 BAC BAC TX.1 (1 entered service)
 Slingsby Cadet TX.1 (362 entered service)
 Slingsby Cadet TX.2 (69 entered service)
 Slingsby Grasshopper TX.1 (115 entered service)
 Slingsby Gull TX.1 (one entered service)
 Slingsby Kite TX.1 (one entered service)
 Slingsby King Kite TX.1 (one entered service)
 Slingsby Prefect TX.1 (15 entered service)
 Slingsby Primary TX.1 (31 entered service)
 Slingsby Swallow TX.1 (5 entered service)

Dual-seat
 Slingsby Cadet TX.3 (126 entered service)
 Slingsby Falcon TX.3 (7 entered service)
 Slingsby Sedbergh TX.1 (95 entered service)

GRP construction

Single-seat
 Schleicher Valiant TX.1 (5 entered service)

Dual-seat
 Schleicher Vanguard TX.1 (10 entered service)
 Schempp-Hirth Kestrel TX.1 (2 entered service)

Motor gliders

No longer in service

 Slingsby Venture TX.1 (one entered service, mainly used at ACCGS)
 Slingsby Venture TX.2 (15 entered service, followed by a further 25)
 Grob Vigilant T.1 (53 entered service, later increased to 63. Retired from service on 6 May 2018)

See also
Royal Air Force
List of aircraft of the RAF

References

External links

Volunteer Gliding Squadrons
 611 Volunteer Gliding Squadron
 612 Volunteer Gliding Squadron
 614 Volunteer Gliding Squadron
 615 Volunteer Gliding Squadron
 616 Volunteer Gliding Squadron
 618 Volunteer Gliding Squadron
 621 Volunteer Gliding Squadron
 622 Volunteer Gliding Squadron
 624 Volunteer Gliding Squadron
 626 Volunteer Gliding Squadron
 631 Volunteer Gliding Squadron
 633 Volunteer Gliding Squadron
 634 Volunteer Gliding Squadron
 635 Volunteer Gliding Squadron
 636 Volunteer Gliding Squadron
 637 Volunteer Gliding Squadron
 642 Volunteer Gliding Squadron
 644 Volunteer Gliding Squadron
 645 Volunteer Gliding Squadron
 661 Volunteer Gliding Squadron
 662 Volunteer Gliding Squadron
 663 Volunteer Gliding Squadron
 664 Volunteer Gliding Squadron

 
Royal Air Force Air Cadets
Royal Air Force aircraft squadrons
Gliding in the United Kingdom